The Sonoma Mountains are a northwest–southeast trending mountain range of the Inner Coast Ranges in the California Coast Ranges System, located in Sonoma County, Northern California.

Geography
It separates the Sonoma Creek watershed from the Petaluma River and Tolay Creek watersheds. The highest point of this range is Sonoma Mountain, elevation .

Jack London State Historic Park, Crane Creek Regional Park, and the Fairfield Osborn Preserve are both on Sonoma Mountain. A number of threatened and endangered species are found in the Sonoma Mountains including the fragrant fritillary (Fritillaria liliacea).

Hydrology
Many creeks rise in the Sonoma Mountains. From the northwestern slopes, Copeland Creek and Hinebaugh Creek flow to the Laguna de Santa Rosa, eventually entering the Pacific Ocean just south of Jenner, California.  Matanzas Creek and Spring Creek flow north into Santa Rosa Creek, another tributary of the Laguna.

Tributaries of Sonoma Creek rise on the eastern exposures of the Sonoma Mountains: Yulupa Creek, Carriger Creek, Graham Creek, Felder Creek, and Rogers Creek. These eventually enter San Pablo Bay south of Sonoma, California.

The southwestern slopes drain to San Pablo Bay by other routes: either Tolay Creek or else some tributary of the Petaluma River such as Lichau Creek, Lynch Creek, or Adobe Creek.

See also
Bennett Mountain
Pomo people
Taylor Mountain

References

External links

 
California Coast Ranges
Mountain ranges of Sonoma County, California
Mountain ranges of the San Francisco Bay Area
Mountain ranges of Northern California